Aline Zeler (born 2 June 1983) is a Belgian footballer who plays as a striker for KRC Genk in Belgian Women's Super League.

Career
From 2018 to 2020 Zeler played for PSV of the Women's Eredivisie. She previously played for Belgian First Division clubs RSC Anderlecht and Sint-Truiden. She was the season's top scorer in 2010 and 2011.

She was a member of the Belgian national team from 2005. She is the record player of the Belgian national team with 111 matches.

International goals

Honours
Anderlecht
 Belgian Women's Super League: 2017–18

Standard Liège
 Belgian Women's Super League: 2015–16, 2016–17
 Belgian league: 2011
 Belgian Cup: 2006
 BeNe Super Cup: 2011

References

External links

 
 
 
 
 

1983 births
Living people
Belgian women's footballers
Women's association football forwards
Belgium women's international footballers
FIFA Century Club
Super League Vrouwenvoetbal players
Standard Liège (women) players
RSC Anderlecht (women) players
PSV (women) players
BeNe League players
Sint-Truidense V.V. (women) players
KRC Genk Ladies players
Belgian expatriate sportspeople in the Netherlands
Expatriate women's footballers in the Netherlands
UEFA Women's Euro 2017 players